Foodo (ISO 639-3 fod) is a Guang language spoken in and around the town of Sèmèrè in the north of Benin. There are approximately 37,000 speakers (taking the most recent estimate and adding the estimated 3.2% a year growth rate for Benin). A large proportion of the population live beyond the homeland in other parts of Benin, as well as in neighboring Togo, Nigeria, and Ghana. There may be as many as 1,000 living in Ghana.

The language has its origin in Ghana. Approximately 200 to 300 years ago, a group of Guang speakers migrated from the south of Ghana to Sèmèrè along the ancient cola trade route which extended through Togo and Benin to Nigeria. The various origins of Foodo speakers are still retained in clan names."

Sociolinguistic background
Foodo is one of the national languages of Benin. In the Beninese sociopolitical context 'national language' is interpreted to mean all African languages spoken within the borders of the country.

The Foodo have close historical and cultural links through Islam to the Tem (often known as Kotokoli), in and around the town of Sokode in Togo. Many Foodo are bilingual in Tem as a trade language.

Linguistic research

Foodo Publications

Phonology

Consonants
Foodo has 24 consonant phonemes. Consonants in parentheses are found only in loan words.

Vowels
Like other Guang languages, Foodo has nine phonemic vowels. Vowel length is contrastive, resulting in a total of 18 vowels.

Short vowels

Long vowels

Tones
Foodo is a tonal language, meaning that pitch differences are used to distinguish one word from another. These contrasts may be lexical or grammatical.

There are two tones, High (H) and Low (L).

Foodo also has automatic downstep, where a H following a L is always pronounced on a lower pitch than the preceding H within the same phonological phrase. Numerous tonal processes occur once words are placed in context.

Syllable structure
In underlying forms, there are five possible syllable types: CV, CV:, CVV, CVC, V and VC. Except for some pronominal forms, both V and VC are limited to affixes. The only consonants which occur in the coda position are nasals.

Vowel harmony
Foodo has vowel harmony. All vowels in the stem agree in regard to their ATR quality. Prefixes and most suffixes receive their ATR feature from the ATR quality of the stem. There is also some rounding vowel harmony in nouns, but this is more restrictive and often varies between speakers.

Orthography
The Foodo orthography uses modified Roman script, adding various characters to represent sounds that do not occur in European languages.

Consonants

Vowels

Tones
The Foodo orthography marks an acute accent on the first syllable of the word if that syllable is H tone, and leaves all other syllables unmarked. e.g.á é ɛ́ í ɩ́ ó ɔ́ ú ʊ́

Grammar

Noun classes
Foodo has ten noun classes. Most nouns consist of a stem with a noun class prefix and a noun class suffix. But it is more helpful to speak of classification being based on agreement patterns rather than just on the form of a single affix. Nouns are grouped into different sets which share common agreement phenomena within the noun phrase and on concordant anaphoric pronouns outside the noun phrase. The tone on noun class prefixes behaves similarly to other Guang languages.

Syntax
Foodo is an SVO language. Adverbial phrases are generally clause final. The order of morphemes within a verbal word is: subject anaphoric clitic — negative marker — TAM — verb stem — directional].

Verb Conjugations

Sample text

References

https://joshuaproject.net/people_groups/11223/BN

Guang languages
Languages of Benin